Hi-Tops is a 1985 Christian movie musical about the lives of several high school students and a trio of angels who are sent to Earth to experience and study peer pressure. The film was originally a successful  stage production that toured nationally.

The name of the musical, and of the eponymous band that figures in the plot, is derived from the high-top style of shoes popular among youth in the mid-1980s.

Plot
Three angels are sent to Earth by Gabriel on a "fact finding mission" to blend in with the teenagers at a high school and learn first hand what peer pressure is. At the same time, Lucifer shows up to try to win some souls for his side. Chaos ensues, and so does a lot of music and dancing. All the main teenage characters, except the angels, are trying out to be in a band called "Hi-Tops". There are a few sub plots involving nerds, high school sweethearts, cheating on tests, taking drugs, etc.

Cast
As credited at the conclusion of the film:

Songs

References

1985 films
Films about evangelicalism
1980s musical comedy films
The Devil in film
Demons in film
1985 comedy films
1980s English-language films